St Claret School Nallajerla is an English Medium School started in 1985. It inculcates moral and discipline among the students. It is situated in the heart of Nallajerla by the side of National highway. The school is managed by Claretian Missionaries.

References

Catholic schools in India
Claretians
Schools in West Godavari district
Educational institutions established in 1985
1985 establishments in Andhra Pradesh
Christian schools in Andhra Pradesh